Minecraft Legends is an upcoming action-strategy video game developed by Mojang Studios and Blackbird Interactive and published by Xbox Game Studios. It is set to be released for Nintendo Switch, PlayStation 4, PlayStation 5, Windows, Xbox One, and Xbox Series X/S on April 18, 2023. It is a spin-off of Minecraft.

Gameplay
Minecraft Legends is an action strategy video game that has strategic elements at its core, with mechanics inspired by action games. It is explored from a third-person perspective. The game features both cooperative and competitive multiplayer.

Plot
Minecraft Legends takes place in the Minecraft universe during an invasion by the piglins from the Nether. As the Nether spreads its corruption across the Overworld, a great hero (the player) brings their banner to save the Overworld and bring together its mobs to help defend their home. The events Legends take place in are neither fact nor fiction in the Minecraft universe, but rather take place in a tale that has been passed down through generations.

Development
Minecraft Legends began development in 2018. The game was announced during the Xbox and Bethesda Games Showcase on June 12, 2022. After the show, a trailer on the Minecraft YouTube channel confirmed additional platforms. It is developed by series creators Mojang Studios in collaboration with Blackbird Interactive, a team founded by former Relic Entertainment employees, who are best known for developing the real-time strategy video game series Homeworld.

Legends is currently planned to be released on 18 April 2023.

References

External links

Microsoft games
Minecraft
Nintendo Switch games
PlayStation 4 games
PlayStation 5 games
Action video games
Strategy video games
Upcoming video games scheduled for 2023
Video games developed in Sweden
Video games developed in Canada
Windows games
Xbox One games
Xbox Series X and Series S games